Kim Chun-sop is a North Korean politician who served as a member of the National Defense Commission and a member of the Supreme People's Assembly.

Biography
In September 2010 he was appointed second secretary of the WPK Provincial Party Committee of Jagang Province, in 2013 he was appointed chief secretary. In April 2015, at the 3rd meeting of the 13th Supreme People's Assembly, he was elected a member of the National Defense Commission instead of Pak To-chun and as director of the WPK Munition Industry department. Prior to that appointment, he was ranked 79th in the country's hierarchy. He is under sanctions of the European Union.

References

Workers' Party of Korea politicians
21st-century North Korean politicians
Year of birth missing (living people)
Living people
Members of the Supreme People's Assembly
ko:김춘섭